This is the discography of Cantopop artist Eason Chan (Chinese: 陳奕迅). Chan has won the Golden Melody Award multiple times.

Studio albums

Capital Artists era (1996-2000)

Music Plus (EEG) era (2000-2005)

Cinepoly era (2005-present)

Extended plays

Compilations albums

Cover/Remix albums

Live albums

Chan, Edison
Pop music discographies